The term Coy may refer to:


Places

United States
 Coy, Arkansas, a town
 Coy, Alabama, an unincorporated community
 Coy, Missouri, an unincorporated community
 Coy Branch, Missouri, a stream

Elsewhere
 Coy Burn, Scotland, a stream
 Coy, Spain, a village
 Coolawanyah Station Airport, IATA airport code "COY"

Other uses
 Coy (name), a list of people and a fictional character with the surname or given name
 Coy Cup, awarded to the Senior AA ice hockey champions of British Columbia
 COY, the ICAO designator for Coyne Airways, a British airline
 Abbreviation for company in the UK and some Commonwealth militaries

See also
 Coy Site, Arkansas, United States, an archaeological site 
 Coi (disambiguation)
 Koi, a type of ornamental domesticated fish
 Koi (disambiguation)
 McCoy (disambiguation)